Guido Fiorini (1897–1966) was an Italian engineer, architect and art director. He was associated with the futurist movement.

Selected filmography

 Loyalty of Love (1934)
 Just Married (1934)
 Red Passport (1935)
 Adam's Tree (1936)
 The Former Mattia Pascal (1937)
 Marcella (1937)
 The Man from Nowhere (1937)
 The Three Wishes (1937)
 Tonight at Eleven (1938)
 Princess Tarakanova (1938)
 The Life of Giuseppe Verdi (1938)
 I Want to Live with Letizia (1938)
 Castles in the Air (1939)
 Department Store (1939)
 The Dream of Butterfly (1939)
 Abandonment (1940)
 Beyond Love (1940)
 Manon Lescaut (1940)
 Eternal Melodies (1940)
 Saint Rogelia (1940)
 The Sin of Rogelia Sanchez (1940)
 Beatrice Cenci (1941)
 Odessa in Flames (1942)
 The Woman of Sin (1942)
 The Two Orphans (1942)
 The Countess of Castiglione (1942)
 Harlem (1943)
 The Children Are Watching Us (1944)
 Disturbance (1942)
 Crossroads of Passion (1948)
 The Golden Madonna (1949)
 Miracle in Milan (1951)
 It's Love That's Ruining Me (1951)
 The Adventures of Mandrin (1952)
 The Dream of Zorro (1952)
 The Last Five Minutes (1955)
 Carthage in Flames (1960)

References

Bibliography
 Poretti, Sergio. Italian Modernisms: Architecture and construction in the twentieth century. Gangemi Editore Spa.

External links

1897 births
1966 deaths
Italian art directors
20th-century Italian architects
Architects from Bologna